The 2015–16 Liechtenstein Cup is the 71st season of Liechtenstein's annual cup competition. Seven clubs competed with a total of 17 teams for one spot in the first qualifying round of the 2016–17 UEFA Europa League. FC Vaduz are the defending champions.

Participating clubs

TH Title holders.

First round
The First Round involved the 13 teams which didn't qualify for the semifinals in the last season. Three of them received a bye to the Second round.

|colspan="3" style="background-color:#99CCCC; text-align:center;"|25 August 2015

|-
|colspan="3" style="background-color:#99CCCC; text-align:center;"|26 August 2015

|}

Second round
The five winners of the First Round, along with the three teams which received a bye in the First round (USV Eschen/Mauren III, FC Ruggell II and FC Schaan III), competed in the Second Round.

|colspan="3" style="background-color:#99CCCC; text-align:center;"|15 September 2015

|-
|colspan="3" style="background-color:#99CCCC; text-align:center;"|16 September 2015

|-
|colspan="3" style="background-color:#99CCCC; text-align:center;"|30 September 2015

|}

Quarterfinals
The four winners of the Second Round, along with the semifinalists in the last season (FC Vaduz, USV Eschen/Mauren, FC Vaduz II (U23) and FC Triesenberg), competed in the quarterfinals.

|colspan="3" style="background-color:#99CCCC; text-align:center;"|27 October 2015

|-
|colspan="3" style="background-color:#99CCCC; text-align:center;"|3 November 2015

|-
|colspan="3" style="background-color:#99CCCC; text-align:center;"|4 November 2015

|}

Semifinals

|colspan="3" style="background-color:#99CCCC; text-align:center;"|5 April 2016

|-
|colspan="3" style="background-color:#99CCCC; text-align:center;"|6 April 2016

|}

Final

References

External links
 
RSSSF

Liechtenstein Football Cup seasons
Cup
Liechtenstein Cup